Roelandts is a Dutch patronymic surname ("Roeland's"). Closely similar forms of the name are Roeland, Roelands, Roelandse, Roelandt, Roelans, Roelant, and Roelants.  Notable people with these surnames include:

Roeland
Joop Roeland (1931–2010), Dutch Catholic priest in Austria
Roelandt
Danny Roelandt (born 1955), Belgian sprinter
Louis Roelandt (1786–1864), Flemish architect
Roelandts
Jürgen Roelandts (born 1985), Belgian road cyclist
Kevin Roelandts (born 1982), Belgian footballer, currently playing for Zulte-Waregem
Roelants
Astrid Roelants, Belgian singer-songwriter of Tunisian origin better known as Ameerah
François Roelants du Vivier (born 1947), Belgian FDF politician
Gaston Roelants (born 1937), Belgian steeplechaser and cross country runner
 (1895–1966), Flemish novelist and poet

See also
Roeland, Dutch masculine given name

Dutch-language surnames
Patronymic surnames